Muhammad Hussein Yacoub is a Salafi Islamic scholar in the Arab world who has given hundreds of lectures in Da'wah. A number of his books are currently being published.

Birth and family
He was born in 1956 in the Matimdiyah area of Imbaba, in the Al Jizah Governorate in Egypt. Yacoub is the oldest of four brothers and has one older sister.

Seeking Islamic knowledge
Yacoub memorized the entire Qur'an at an early age, and learned about the study of Hadith. He studied the six canonical books of Sunni Islam with Moroccan scholar Muhammad Abu Khubza, in addition to studying with fellow Egyptian Abd al-Hamid Kishk. He then lived in Saudi Arabia  from 1980 to 1985, studying with Saudi  clerics Abd al-Aziz ibn Baz and Muhammad ibn al Uthaymeen.

Works 
He had various lessons and lectures such as:

 “Cures” (In Arabic: الأدوية).  
 “How to Repent” (In Arabic: كيف أتوب؟).
 “Bring upon us to the direction” (In Arabic: إلى الهدى ائتنا).
Moreover, he wrote lots of books, such as: 

 “Description of Conformer Woman” (In Arabic: صفات الأخت الملتزمة).
 “The serious Conformer”. (In Arabic:الجدية في الالتزام).
 "The secrets of Ramadan lovers ". (In Arabic:أسرار المحبين في رمضان).  
 "A new heart for those who want." (In Arabic: قلب جديد لمن يريد).

References

External links
 Official Website
 Yacoub page on Islamway
 some lectures 
 Biography of Muhammad Hussein Yacoub

Egyptian Salafis
Egyptian Sunni Muslim scholars of Islam
Islam and antisemitism
Egyptian Islamists
Living people
1956 births
People from Giza Governorate